Cayos Zapatilla (Zapatilla Cayes) is a group of two uninhabited islands located east of Isla Bastimentos in the Bocas del Toro Archipelago of Bocas del Toro Province, Panama. North Cayo Zapatilla is 14 hectares long while south Cayo Zapatilla is comparatively bigger with 34 hectares. Both islands lie within the boundaries of the Isla Bastimentos National Marine Park.

See also

 List of islands of Panama
 List of islands
 Desert island

References

Caribbean islands of Panama
Uninhabited islands of Panama